SM UB-129 was a German Type UB III submarine or U-boat in the German Imperial Navy during World War I. She was commissioned into the German Imperial Navy on 11 June 1918 as SM UB-129.

UB-129 was lost 31 October 1918 in Fiume after the surrender of Austria-Hungary.

Construction

She was built by AG Weser of Bremen and following just under a year of construction, launched at Bremen on 11 May 1918. UB-129 was commissioned later the same year under the command of Kptlt. Karl Neumann. Like all Type UB III submarines, UB-129 carried 10 torpedoes and was armed with a  deck gun. UB-129 had a displacement of  while surfaced and  when submerged. Her engines enabled her to travel at  when surfaced and  when submerged.

Summary of raiding history

References

Notes

Citations

Bibliography 

 

German Type UB III submarines
World War I submarines of Germany
U-boats commissioned in 1918
1918 ships
Ships built in Bremen (state)
Maritime incidents in 1918
U-boats scuttled in 1918
World War I shipwrecks in the Adriatic Sea